The Yiman, also known as Yeeman, Eoman or Jiman, and by themselves in modern times as Iman, are an Aboriginal Australian people living in the Upper Dawson River region around Taroom of eastern Central Queensland.

Language
Almost nothing is known directly about Yiman, because the tribe was thought to have been wiped out before any words could be recorded.

Society
Yiman people persist as they have for tens of thousands of years. While little may be known to the general public about Yiman social structure, Yiman people survive and thrive. Their territory borders Wuli Wuli, Wadjigu, Garingbul, Gungabula, Mandandanji and Barunggam language regions. In a settler crusade to hunt them down, in late 1857, many of the Yiman victims killed were examined to see if they bore on their chests the distinct boomerang design typical of the Yiman thought responsible for the Fraser family massacre.

History
Records of the Yiman mainly concern the Hornet Bank massacre which took place on 27 October 1857. The incident took at a site known as "Goongarry" which had been squatted by the Scottish immigrant Andrew Scott who had applied for a tender over this area of Yiman traditional land in late 1853. It has been assumed, on the basis of settler practice, that Scott had occupied this stretch of territory at least a year before that date.

Though Scott's tender was approved four years later, he leased the property to a shipwright John Fraser in March 1854. Fraser died later that year of pneumonia, and the lease was continued by his wife, 5 sons and 4 daughters, who, disregarding Scott's advice not to allow blacks anywhere near the holding, befriended the local Yiman, since they had experience earlier of friendly Aboriginal hands on various stations on the Darling Downs. The family also employed a tutor Mr. Neagle. According to the account of the sole survivor Sylvester Fraser who managed to hide after being skulled by a nulla nulla, they had been attacked either at dawn or according to other accounts just as the full moon rose, by roughly 100 tribesmen. The 3 oldest girls were raped before being killed. One other of the Frazer family survived: William who was away in Ipswich. Judging from one report, it is possible some Mandandanji also joined in the attack. It may well be that the Yiman, according to Gordon Reid, were just one of a confederation of tribes involved, and not the only perpetrators.

Pursuing the Yiman
The following day, Walter Powell and his native police tracked down and ambushed one of about 10 bands believed to be responsible, the only one thought to have moved westwards, killing 5 and wounding several others. In a second incident, Powell and his troops, joined by William Fraser, killed 3 men and 3 women near Carrabah station, on 27 November. Some days later, they, now joined by Second-Lieutenant Robert Walker killed another 7 natives at Jundah station, though the Jundah station manager maintained they hadn't been involved. Then the group murdered 11 other Aborigines to the east, in the vicinity of Cockatoo station. Tracking suspected participants hailing from the Baking Board district, west of Chinchilla, they came across a band of Aborigines at Redbank, rounded them up and killed them over the protests of the local Ross family. Settlers noticed Aboriginals shifting their grounds, seeking security in the Auburn and Burnet districts. Settlers from the Upper Dawson and these areas organized a settler vigilante 'crusade in December', which lasted 6 weeks, during which an estimated 80 more Aborigines were killed in several camps.

The flight of the Yiman deep into the Auburn and Burnet districts suggest they had traditional ties with native groups indigenous to this region. Taking a lead from linguistic research by Nils Holmer, it appears that the band dispersal betrays evidence that the Upper Dawson people were part of the Wakka Wakka western division of a linguistic grouping that extended also to the dominant Kabi Kabi of the Wide Bay area. A guerilla war ensued for some 18 months. In January 1858. 200-300 Aborigines launched a night attack on a group with the magistrate William Wiseman, on the road between Rannes and the Gracemere station. The assault failed, but Wiseman blamed the Upper Dawson tribes. After the killing of 4 settlers in April, 60 tribesmen attacked In July 1858 50 to 60 Aborigines attacked Henry Gregory's Gwambagwyne station, near Taroom.

In the reprisals by settlers in the district and native police, upwards of 300 Yiman were hunted down and killed, and the executioners were not subject to prosecution. According to Gordon Reid, the manner of reprisal contributed to setting the pattern governing government policy and settler attitudes towards the indigenous peoples of Queensland down to the end of the 19th century. Years later, Steele Rudd's father, Thomas Davis recalled riding through the scrubland and sighting "the bleaching bones of the dead blacks strewn here and there - a gruesome sight - full-ribbed bodies, fleshless arms, disjointed leg-bones and ghastly grinning skulls peeping out of the grass."

Recent history
The Iman had not been wiped out. In 1998, they filed an application with the National Native Title Tribunal (NNTT) for recognition of native title to their homeland.
On 14 September 2015, an agreement was entered on the Register of Indigenous Land Use Agreements by the NNTT.
On 23 June 2016, the case was concluded when John Reeves, J. of the Federal Court, sitting in Taroom, approved a consent decree. The judge said that the court order did not grant the Iman native title; instead, it recognised their pre-existing title; and their continuing connection to the land, despite its being 150 years since they were forced into hiding.
The same day, Anthony Lynham, Minister for State Development and Minister for Natural Resources and Mines in the Government of Queensland, welcomed the outcome.

Notes

Citations

Sources

Further reading

Aboriginal peoples of Queensland